Cyrtauchenius is a genus of wafer trapdoor spiders that was first described by Tamerlan Thorell in 1869. Originally placed with the Ctenizidae, it was moved to the Cyrtaucheniidae in 1985.

Species
 it contains fourteen species, almost all from Algeria:
Cyrtauchenius artifex (Simon, 1889) – Algeria
Cyrtauchenius bedeli Simon, 1881 – Algeria
Cyrtauchenius bicolor (Simon, 1889) – Algeria
Cyrtauchenius castaneiceps (Simon, 1889) – Algeria
Cyrtauchenius dayensis Simon, 1881 – Algeria
Cyrtauchenius inops (Simon, 1889) – Algeria
Cyrtauchenius latastei Simon, 1881 – Algeria
Cyrtauchenius longipalpus (Denis, 1945) – Algeria
Cyrtauchenius luridus Simon, 1881 – Algeria
Cyrtauchenius maculatus (Simon, 1889) – Algeria
Cyrtauchenius structor (Simon, 1889) – Algeria
Cyrtauchenius talpa Simon, 1891 – USA
Cyrtauchenius terricola (Lucas, 1846) (type) – Algeria
Cyrtauchenius vittatus Simon, 1881 – Algeria

References

Cyrtaucheniidae
Mygalomorphae genera
Spiders of Africa
Spiders of the United States
Taxa named by Tamerlan Thorell